Sharon Shinn (born 1957) is an American novelist who writes combining aspects of fantasy, science fiction and romance.  She has published more than a dozen novels for adult and young adult readers. Her works include the Shifting Circles Series, the Samaria Series, the Twelve Houses Series, and a rewriting of Jane Eyre, Jenna Starborn. She works as a journalist in St. Louis, Missouri and is a graduate of Northwestern University.

Shinn is a die-hard St. Louis Cardinals and St. Louis Rams fan and is also a big fan of the TV Show Lost.  She is a frequent attender of science-fiction/fantasy conventions. Her first Guest of Honor stint at a convention was ArmadilloCon 26. She was also the Guest of Honor at the convention Capricon 29.

In 2009, she donated her archive to the department of Rare Books and Special Collections at Northern Illinois University.

In Laurell K Hamilton's novel Obsidian Butterfly of her Anita Blake: Vampire Hunter series, Anita Blake mentions that she reads Sharon Shinn's novels to help her deal with her phobia of flying.

Awards 
 William L. Crawford Award (awarded by the International Association for the Fantastic in the Arts for best first fantasy novel) (1996)
 Twice nominated for the John W. Campbell Award for Best New Writer (1995, 1996)
 Summers at Castle Auburn named to the ALA list of Best Books (2002).

Works

Safe-Keepers series 

The Safe-Keeper's Secret (Puffin Books, 2004)
The Truth-Teller's Tale (Puffin Books, 2005)
The Dream-Maker's Magic (Viking Press, 2006)

Samaria series 

Archangel (Ace Books, 1996)
Jovah's Angel (Ace Books, 1997)
The Alleluia Files (Ace Books, 1997)
Angelica (Ace Books, 2003) Although this is the fourth novel in the Samaria series, it is set before the first book Archangel.
Angel-Seeker (Ace Books, 2004) This novel is set immediately after the first book Archangel.

Twelve Houses series 

 Flame (Ace Books, 2009) in Quatrain

Mystic and Rider (Ace Books, 2005)
The Thirteenth House (Ace Books, 2006)
Dark Moon Defender (Ace Books, 2006)
Reader and Raelynx (Ace Books, 2007)
Fortune and Fate (Ace Books, 2008)

Elemental Blessings series 

Troubled Waters (Ace Books, 2010)
Royal Airs (Ace Books, 2013)
Jeweled Fire (Ace Books, 2015)
Unquiet Land (Ace Books, 2016)

Shifting Circle series 

The Shape of Desire (Ace Books, 2012)
Still Life With Shape Shifter (Ace Books, 2012)
The Turning Season (Ace Books, 2014)

Uncommon Echoes series 
Echo in Onyx (audiobook, Audible, March 2019; trade paperback and ebook, Ethan Ellenberg Literary Agency, August 2019)
Echo in Emerald (audiobook, Audible, March 2019; trade paperback and ebook, Ethan Ellenberg Literary Agency, 2019)
Echo in Amethyst (audiobook, Audible, March 2019; trade paperback and ebook, Ethan Ellenberg Literary Agency, 2019)

Other novels 
 The Shape-Changer's Wife (Ace Books, 1995)
 Heart of Gold (Ace Books, 2000)
 Wrapt in Crystal (Ace Books, 2000)
 Summers at Castle Auburn (Ace Books, 2002)
 Jenna Starborn (Ace Books, 2003)
 General Winston's Daughter (Viking Press, 2007)
 Gateway (Viking Press, 2009)
 Shattered Warrior (First Second Books, 2017), a graphic novel illustrated by Molly Knox Ostertag

Anthologies and collections

References

External links
 
 On the Plain of Sharon fan site
 Sharon Shinn at Fantastic Fiction
 Sharon Shinn at Fantasy Literature

 Crawford Award Winners
 

20th-century American novelists
21st-century American novelists
American fantasy writers
American romantic fiction writers
American science fiction writers
American women short story writers
American women novelists
1957 births
Living people
Date of birth missing (living people)
Women science fiction and fantasy writers
Women romantic fiction writers
20th-century American women writers
21st-century American women writers
People from Wichita, Kansas
Writers from St. Louis
Writers from Kansas
20th-century American short story writers
21st-century American short story writers
Novelists from Missouri